"The Ghetto" is a song by American Oakland-based rapper Too $hort. It was released on October 8, 1990 via Jive Records as the lead single from his sixth studio album Short Dog's in the House. Recorded at One Little Indian Studios in El Cerrito, California, it was produced and mixed by Al Eaton and Too $hort. The instrumental is based on the Donny Hathaway song of the same name.

The single peaked at number 42 on the Billboard Hot 100, number 12 on the Hot R&B/Hip-Hop Songs and number 3 on the Hot Rap Songs in the United States. The song was later featured on the fictional radio station Radio Los Santos in the 2004 video game Grand Theft Auto: San Andreas.

Track listing

Personnel
Todd "Too $hort" Shaw – rap vocals, producer, mixing
Al Eaton – producer, mixing
Victor Hall – photography
ZombArt – design

Chart positions

References

External links

1990 singles
1990 songs
Too Short songs
Jive Records singles
Songs written by Too Short
Songs written by Leroy Hutson